Imre Holényi (15 January 1926 – 2020) was a Hungarian sailor. He competed in the Flying Dutchman event at the 1960 Summer Olympics.

References

External links
 

1926 births
2020 deaths
Hungarian male sailors (sport)
Olympic sailors of Hungary
Sailors at the 1960 Summer Olympics – Flying Dutchman
People from Balatonfüred
Sportspeople from Veszprém County